A  joke is originally a French type of joke, which takes the form of a riddle. It involves providing the surname of a husband and wife and asking for their child's given name, with the answer forming a pun. For example:

History 
The inventor of this type of joke has never been clearly determined. Several historic examples have been recorded.

Origins 
Wordplay that links an actual surname (or a title) to an imaginary family name has been around since the 18th century:

 In 1770, Marquis de Bièvre invented comtesse Tation and l'abbé Quille.
 comtesse Tation same pronunciation in French as contestation ("dispute")
 l'abbé Quillesame pronunciation as la béquille ("the crutch")
 In 1882, Alphonse Allais invented Jean Rougy de Ontt, Tony Truand, Tom Hatt, Sarah Vigott, Azutat Laure.
 Jean Rougy de Ontt ("I blush from shame")
 Tom Hatttomate ("tomato")
 In 1893, Christophe from the comic strip La Famille Fenouillard invented Guy Mauve and Max Hillaire.
 Guy Mauveguimauve ("marshmallow")
 Max Hillairemaxillaire ("upper jaw")

The game of in-memoriam 

 In late 1964, Juliette Gréco and Françoise Sagan popularized a basic version of the game under the name of "Game of in-memoriam", which was widely exchanged among Parisians.
 In early 1965, Paris Match made it widely-known across France in its first issue of the year, number 823, by publishing over several weeks the best "in-memoriam" from its readers.
 In 1978, Georges Perec created an example in Life: A User's Manual:

 "M. et Mme Hocquard de Tours (I. & V.) have the joy of announcing the birth of their son Adhémar.".
 — (a [= elle] démarre au quart de tour), referring to a car that "starts within a quarter turn" (from the time cars were cranked manually).

The first Monsieur et Madame jokes 

 In 1969, during the shooting of Claude Chabrol's film This Man Must Die, Michel Duchaussoy and Jean Yanne played this game.
They found:
 Judas ... Nana (jus d'ananas → pineapple juice)
 Elvira ... Sacuti (elle vira sa cuti → she dramatically changed her mind)
 Ferdinand ... Saint-Malo à la nage c'est pas d'la tarte (faire Dinan - Saint-Malo à la nage, c'est pas d'la tarte → swimming from Dinan to Saint-Malo is not a piece of cake)

In French culture

Music 
The song Le Papa du papa (1966) by Boby Lapointe is based partially on this idea, mixing births, marriages, genealogy, first names and extended surnames in a complicated manner, in order to end up in the last line with a son with the contrived name of:
 
 same pronunciation as: , meaning "he sells his glasses and my beautiful bags of peach stones"

Comic strip 
Example of a dialogue :

Theatre 
In the 1972 play Le noir te va si bien, Maria Pacôme and Jean le Poulain play a « surname game » (with « Mr. and Mrs. have... »), with the loser having to throw him or herself off a cliff. Following the example (the daughter of Micoton (Mylène)), they successively came up with: the son of Danleta (Alphonse), the son of Teuzemani (Gédéon), the daughter of Enfaillite (Mélusine) and the son of Dalor (Homère).

Other media 

 In Les deux minutes du peuple, François Pérusse regularly makes such jokes.
 Michel Leeb based a skit on the joke, Monsieur et Madame ont un fils, where he tries to explain the nature of the joke to a madame Menvussa.

Television series 
This type of word play was also used by Bart and Lisa in their telephone gags, in the series The Simpsons.

Use in speech therapy 
The joke has been employed by some speech therapists as an activity while interacting with adolescents. It may be done in the usual form, or in reverse: the therapist gives the first name, and the adolescent needs to find the surname.

Use in English 

 "Mr & Mrs jokes" have been commonly featured. on the radio show "I'm Sorry I Haven't a Clue", broadcast on BBC Radio 4 since 1972.

See also 

 Knock-knock joke
 Titegoutte
 Word play
 aptonym

References

Further reading 
 A. Nonyme (pseudonyme),  Monsieur et Madame ont un fils, tome 1, Michel Lafon, 1994 ; rééd. J'ai Lu, 1995
 A. Nonyme (pseudonyme),  Monsieur et Madame ont un fils, tome 2, Michel Lafon, 1995 ; rééd. J'ai Lu, 1996
 Michaël Dupont, Monsieur et madame ont un fils, Grancher, 2003 
 Quentin Le Goff, illustrations de Bérangère Delaporte, Monsieur et madame ont un fils, Tourbillon, 2009 
 Laurent Gaulet, Monsieur et madame ont un fils ! ou une fille : comment l'appellent-ils ? , First éd., 2010 
 Collectif, Monsieur et madame ont un fils, collection « Les blagues culte », Marabout, 2012 
 Arnaud Demanche et Stéphane Rose, Monsieur et madame Timètre ont un fils, comment s'appelle-t-il ? : spécial sexe, coll. « Le sexe qui rit », éd. La Musardine, 2014 
 Éric Mathivet, 400 monsieur & madame ont un fils : & autres blagues, Hachette loisirs, 2016

Jokes
Word play